Steven Craig (born 5 February 1981) is a retired Scottish professional footballer.  He is currently assistant manager of Gala Fairydean Rovers.

Craig has previously played for Falkirk, Motherwell, Aberdeen, Dundee, Livingston, Ross County, Partick Thistle, Wycombe Wanderers and Dumbarton. His father Joe was also a footballer, who played for Partick Thistle and Celtic.

Early life
He was born in Blackburn, Lancashire. His father, Joe Craig, was playing for Blackburn Rovers at the time.

Career
Craig began his career as a youth player at Raith Rovers and after leaving the club in 2000, played one match for junior club Broxburn Athletic He then signed his first professional contract at Scottish First Division club Falkirk, signing initially for three months, but after scoring on his debut on 30 September 2000 against Livingston, he was given a three-year contract.

In January 2003, Craig moved to Scottish Premier League club Motherwell. He made his debut for the club on 29 January 2003 in a 1–0 defeat against Kilmarnock and scored his first goal on 19 February 2003, in a 2–1 win against Dunfermline Athletic. On 5 June 2003, he signed a new one-year contract with the club.

On 12 May 2004, Craig, along with Motherwell team-mate Derek Adams, signed a pre-contract with Aberdeen to join the club on 1 June 2004. He made his debut on the opening day of the 2004–05 season against Rangers. On 24 August 2004, he scored against Berwick Rangers then four days later, scored twice against Livingston in a 2–0 win. These turned out to be his only goals for the club. After falling out of favour with Aberdeen manager Jimmy Calderwood, Craig was allowed to go on trial with Belgian club Sint Truiden and was placed on the transfer list at the end of the season. He also went on trial at Bradford City, At the end of the summer transfer window in August 2005, Craig was released by Aberdeen.

After his release from Aberdeen, Craig had trials at Dunfermline Athletic and Carlisle United. On 15 September 2005, he signed for Dundee. After one season with Dundee, Craig signed for Livingston on 19 June 2006.

Craig signed for Ross County on 6 May 2008. During the 2009–10 season he scored in Ross County's 2–0 victory against Celtic in the Scottish Cup semi–final. He also started in the final, but was on the losing side as Dundee United won 3–0. In the 2010–11 season he scored the winning penalty in the shoot-out as Ross County beat Partick Thistle 4–3 on penalties to reach the Challenge Cup Final. He was an unused substitute in the final as Ross County lifted the trophy, beating Queen of the South 2–0. He was also part of the squad as Ross County won the 2011–12 Scottish First Division and promotion to the top-flight for the first time. At the end of the season, he signed a new one-year contract with the club after turning down a move to Iceland.

Craig left Ross County in August 2012 to sign for Partick Thistle on loan. After being released by Ross County, he then moved to Partick Thistle on a permanent basis on 1 January 2013. Craig won a second successive Scottish First Division winners medal as Partick Thistle won the 2012–13 title, but at the end of the season he was informed by manager Alan Archibald that he would not be offered a new contract by the club.

Craig signed a one-year deal with Wycombe Wanderers on 22 July 2013. On 3 May 2014, he scored Wycombe's second goal in a 3–0 win against Torquay United on the final day of the season, a result which ensured the club avoided relegation from League Two. With Wycombe having secured their place in League Two for another season, Craig signed a contract extension to keep him at the club for another year.

He joined Scottish Championship outfit Dumbarton in July 2015 Making his first start the following week in a 2–1 victory over Hibernian He scored his first goal for the club in a 4–2 defeat against Hibs in October 2015, just two minutes after coming on as a substitute. However, Craig was released after just 6 months with the club.

On 8 February 2016, Craig signed a contract with Forfar Athletic in a deal until the end of the season.

On January 10, 2022, he joined Gala Fairydean Rovers as Assistant Manager to Martin Scott.

Career statistics

A.  Other includes Scottish Challenge Cup and Football League Trophy.
B.  Falkirk total includes two First Division appearances not recorded on soccerbase. One in 2001–02 and one in 2002–03.
C.  Ross County total includes one Scottish Cup and one Scottish Challenge Cup appearance and goal in 2008–09 not recorded on soccerbase.

Honours
Ross County
Scottish Challenge Cup: 2010–11
Scottish First Division (second tier): 2011–12

Partick Thistle
Scottish First Division (second tier): 2012–13

References

External links
 
 

Living people
1981 births
Scottish footballers
Falkirk F.C. players
Motherwell F.C. players
Aberdeen F.C. players
Dundee F.C. players
Livingston F.C. players
Ross County F.C. players
Partick Thistle F.C. players
Wycombe Wanderers F.C. players
Dumbarton F.C. players
Forfar Athletic F.C. players
Scottish Premier League players
Scottish Football League players
English Football League players
Footballers from Blackburn
Association football forwards
Anglo-Scots
Worcester City F.C. players
Stafford Rangers F.C. players
Broxburn Athletic F.C. players